Orlando Harrison Manning (May 18, 1847 – September 19, 1909) was an American politician.

Born in Abington, Indiana, Manning moved with his family to Iowa. He eventually studied law and settled in Carroll, Iowa, to practice law. Manning served in the Iowa House of Representatives 1876-1880 and as Lieutenant Governor of Iowa 1882–1886 serving under Governor Buren R. Sherman. Later he practiced law in Denver, Colorado, Topeka, Kansas, Chicago, Illinois, and New York City. He died in Atlantic City, New Jersey.

Orlando H. Manning is the namesake of Manning, Iowa.

References

1847 births
1909 deaths
People from Wayne County, Indiana
People from Carroll County, Iowa
Iowa lawyers
Kansas lawyers
Lawyers from Chicago
Lawyers from Denver
Lawyers from New York City
Members of the Iowa House of Representatives
Lieutenant Governors of Iowa
19th-century American politicians